Jiffy Steamer, located in Union City, Tennessee, manufactures a variety of clothing steamers. Jiffy Steamer was founded in 1940.

Product line development
The company patented the Model J-1 hat steamer in 1940. Hats, such as fedoras, were a popular element of 1940s fashion. The common way of retaining a hat's shape was to place it over a steaming kettle of water. The J-1 was a standalone device that could do the same task without the requirement of a stove. The concept was later applied to the J-2 garment steamer, a larger version of the J-1 hat steamer that included a clothing rack. This product was aimed at the clothing industry to provide a way of removing wrinkles. The company now offers upgraded versions of the original J-2 clothes steamers, including the J-2000 steamer and several variants that provide different head attachments, and the J-4000, more geared towards the commercial marketplace. The company also manufactures a handheld steamer, the ESTEAM.

Quality and safety certifications
Jiffy Steamer products have met the quality and safety requirements for sale and distribution for most major domestic and international agencies tasked with certification.  These include:
UL Mark, the registered certification mark of UL LLC, an independent, not-for-profit, product safety testing and certification organization
CSA Mark, product safety and quality mark required for selling products in Canada
CE Mark, which indicated conformity to the legal requirements of the European Union (EU) Directive with respect to safety, health, environment, and consumer protection
TUV GS Mark, a voluntary certification and recognized symbol in Germany for safety-tested products
NOM Mark, Mexican government safety testing mark required for all electronic products

US patent information
Jiffy Steamer's products and/or their components are covered by one or more of the following United States Patents: D421,165; D423,156; D426,924.

References

External links
  
 Corporate Website

Companies based in Tennessee
Manufacturing companies established in 1940
1940 establishments in Tennessee